Antonious Bonner (born November 3, 1972) was a football player in the CFL for eleven years. Bonner played defensive back for the Ottawa Rough Riders and Toronto Argonauts from 1995 to 2006. He won two Grey Cup Championships (1997 and 2004) with the Argos.

 Bonner grew up in Greenwood Mississippi, where he starred at Greenwood High School, alongside his older brother, Carlos Bonner

1972 births
Living people
African-American players of Canadian football
Canadian football defensive backs
Ottawa Rough Riders players
Toronto Argonauts players
Ole Miss Rebels football players
Players of Canadian football from Chicago
Players of American football from Chicago
21st-century African-American sportspeople
20th-century African-American sportspeople